The 1983 Queen's Grand Prix was a women's tennis tournament played on indoor carpet courts in Tokyo, Japan that was part of the 1983 Virginia Slims World Championship Series. The tournament was held from 12 September through 18 September 1983. Unseeded Lisa Bonder won the singles title and earned $40,000 first-prize money as well as 100 Virginia Slims ranking points.

Finals

Singles
 Lisa Bonder defeated  Andrea Jaeger 6–2, 5–7, 6–1
 It was Bonder's 1st singles title of the year and the 3rd of her career.

References

External links
 ITF tournament edition details

Queens Grand Prix
Pan Pacific Open
1983 in Japanese tennis
Pan